Callopatiria granifera, the red starfish, is a southern African species of starfish in the family Asterinidae.

Description
It has a dorsal surface resembling a tiled roof and its arms taper to rounded ends.

Distribution
It is found from Namibia to Durban on the South African coast, subtidally

Ecology
This starfish feeds on food detritus.

References

Asterinidae
Animals described in 1847